Diego is the debut studio album of Diego Boneta, released in 2005. At that time, Boneta was known as Diego González or, simply, Diego.

Track listing
"Solo Existes Tú" (Bruno, Kara DioGuardi) – 3:05
"Responde" (Jade Ell, Mats Hedström) – 3:46
"Más" (Paulyna Carraz, Memo Méndez Guiu) – 3:47
"La Solución" (Leonel García, Nahuel Schajris) – 3:08
"No Quiero" (García) – 3:48
"Mi Revolución" (Cachorro López, Sebastián Schon) – 3:40
"Siempre Te Amaré" (Billy Méndez, Alex Sirvent) – 2:54
"Mientes" (Juan Gigena Abalos) – 2:56
"Me Muero sin Ti" (Charles Twong, Farhad Zand) – 2:56
"Te voy a Encontrar" (Mario Sandoval) – 3:27
"Desde Que Estás Aquí" (María Bernal) – 3:36

Diego(+D) Más
Special Edition [Bonus Tracks]
"Más" [Versión Acústica] (Carraz, Guiu) – 3:32
"Más" [Remix] (Carraz, Guiu) – 6:20
"Responde" [En Portugués] (Ell, Hedström) – 2:57
"Más" [En Portugués] (Carraz, Guiu) – 3:50
"Solo Exsistes tú" [En Portugués]

Diego (Edição Brasil)
"Quero só você"
"Responde"
"Mais"
"Não vai ser fácil"
"Revolução"
"Sempre te amarei"
"Mente"
"Não posso viver sem você"
"La Solución" (Spanish languaged bonus tracks)
"Te voy a encontrar" (Spanish languaged bonus tracks)
"Desde que estás aqui" (Spanish languaged bonus tracks)

Personnel 

Juan Gigena Abalos – guitar
Dany Avila – drums
Juan Blas Caballero – arranger, keyboards, programming, engineer, bass
Silvio Furmanski – guitar
Claudio Ledda - coros
Alejandro Giacomán – mastering
Diego Javier González – vocals
Camilo Lara – executive producer, A&R
Güido Laris – vocal director
Olga Laris – photography
Cachorro López – arranger, keyboards, programming, producer, Bass, musical direction, baritone guitar
Melissa Mochulske – A&R
Demian Nava – engineer
Claudio Rabello – producer
Joan Romagosa – producer
Pablo López Ruiz – keyboards, programming
Sebastián Schon – guitar, arranger, keyboards, programming, engineer
Cesar Sogbe – mixing
Guillermo Vadala – bass

References

2005 albums
Diego Boneta albums